Calceostoma calceostoma is a species of monogenean in the family Calceostomatidae. It is a parasite of the brown meagre (Sciaena umbra) in the Mediterranean.

References

External links 

Animals described in 1857
Monopisthocotylea